, meaning "Headland of the Moon", was a name formerly in use for part of a plateau in Mita, Minato-ku, Tokyo in Japan. One explanation of the name is that it was considered a particularly good place to view the moon over what is now Tokyo Bay.

The name had become obsolete by the middle or late Meiji period, when references were made to the loss of the view due to new buildings.

 composed a tanka on Tsuki no Misaki:

There are some origin candidates for it, which might be originated from admiration of nice view including the moon:
 Tokugawa Ieyasu named it in Keichō era;
 it was a nearby place of a notice board set up at  1-chome;
 it was a generic name of Saikai-ji.

Hiroshige
Japanese artist Hiroshige designed a couple of prints of the moon seen over the bay from within a tea-house or brothel on Tsuki no Misaki.

References 

Geography of Minato, Tokyo